John Malu (born 24 May 1978) is a former rugby league footballer who played for the North Queensland Cowboys and Northern Eagles in the National Rugby League. He primarily played .

Playing career
In Round 20 of the 1998 NRL season, Malu made his NRL debut for the North Queensland Cowboys in their 16–22 loss to the South Sydney Rabbitohs at Malanda Stadium. He spent the majority of the season playing for the Cowboys' Queensland Cup feeder club, the Townsville Stingers.

Statistics

NRL
 Statistics are correct to the end of the 2002 season

References

1978 births
Living people
Australian rugby league players
North Queensland Cowboys players
Northern Eagles players
Rugby league wingers
Rugby league five-eighths
Rugby league players from Queensland